Peter John Sullivan (March 15, 1821 – March 2, 1883) was an Irish-American soldier and lawyer, who became United States Ambassador to Colombia.

Life
Sullivan was born March 15, 1821, in Cork, Ireland. Sullivan's parents brought him to Philadelphia when he was two years old, and he received his education at the University of Pennsylvania. He served in the Mexican-American War, and received the brevet of major for meritorious services.

After retiring to civil life he became one of the official stenographers of the U.S. Senate, and in 1848 went to live in Cincinnati, Ohio, where he was admitted to the bar. He was prominent there as an opponent of the Know-nothing movement.

During the American Civil War, Sullivan took an active part in organizing several Ohio volunteer regiments and went to the scene of action as colonel of the 48th Ohio Infantry. He was severely wounded at the Battle of Shiloh. His injuries would force him to resign on August 7, 1863. On December 11, 1866, President Andrew Johnson nominated Sullivan for appointment to the brevet grade of brigadier general of volunteers to rank from March 13, 1865, and the U.S. Senate confirmed the appointment on February 6, 1867.

In 1867, Sullivan was appointed U.S. Minister to Colombia and held that office until 1869. He then returned to the practice of the law.

Sullivan died at Cincinnati on March 2, 1883, and was buried in Spring Grove Cemetery.

See also

List of American Civil War brevet generals

Notes

References
 Eicher, John H., and David J. Eicher, Civil War High Commands. Stanford: Stanford University Press, 2001. .
Attribution
 The entry cites:
Catholic Telegraph (Cincinnati) files;
Appleton's Cyclopedia of American Biography

1821 births
1883 deaths
Union Army colonels
Ambassadors of the United States to Colombia
19th-century American diplomats
19th-century American lawyers